Augustowo  is a village in the administrative district of Gmina Barcin, within Żnin County, Kuyavian-Pomeranian Voivodeship, in north-central Poland.

The village has a population of 112.

References

Villages in Żnin County